Ziyad Saeed Al-Kord bin Samir, known simply as Ziyad Al-Kord (born 15 January 1974 in Gaza), is a Palestinian footballer who has played with various clubs in the Palestinian territories, Jordan, and Saudi Arabia.

He is Palestine's second all-time leading scorer behind Fahed Attal with 10 goals in 30 games. He is the first Palestinian player to have played professionally in Saudi Arabia.

International goals
Scores and results list the Palestine's goal tally first.

References

External links

1974 births
Living people
Palestinian footballers
Palestinian expatriate footballers
Palestine international footballers
Expatriate footballers in Jordan
Expatriate footballers in Saudi Arabia
Al-Wehdat SC players
Association football forwards
Palestinian expatriate sportspeople in Jordan
Palestinian expatriate sportspeople in Saudi Arabia
Footballers at the 2002 Asian Games
Asian Games competitors for Palestine